State1999.05.20

Incumbents

Federal Government 
 President: Gerald Ford (R-Michigan) (until January 20), Jimmy Carter (D-Georgia) (starting January 20)
 Vice President: Nelson Rockefeller (R-New York) (until January 20), Walter Mondale (D-Minnesota) (starting January 20)
 Chief Justice: Warren E. Burger (Minnesota)
 Speaker of the House of Representatives: Carl Albert (D-Oklahoma) (until January 3), Tip O'Neill (D-Massachusetts) (starting January 4)
 Senate Majority Leader: Mike Mansfield (D-Montana) (until January 3), Robert Byrd (D-West Virginia) (starting January 3)
 Congress: 94th (until January 3), 95th (starting January 3)

Events

January

 January
 The world's first personal computer, the Commodore PET, is demonstrated at the winter Consumer Electronics Show in Chicago.
 The Coalition of Free Men is founded in Columbia, Maryland, in order to create a unified voice in addressing issues concerning men and boys. The organisation would later become the National Coalition for Men, America's oldest men's rights organization.
 January 3 – Apple Computer is incorporated.
 January 9  
 Super Bowl XI: The Oakland Raiders defeat the Minnesota Vikings 32–14 at the Rose Bowl in Pasadena, California.
 Rock band Toto is founded by David Paich and Jeff Porcaro in Van Nuys, Los Angeles.
 January 17 – In the first execution after the reintroduction of the death penalty in the United States, Gary Gilmore is executed by firing squad in Utah.
 January 19 
Snow falls in Miami, Florida (despite its ordinarily tropical climate) for the only time in its history.  Snowfall has occurred farther south in the United States only on the high mountains of the state of Hawaii.
President Gerald Ford pardons Iva Toguri D'Aquino (aka “Tokyo Rose”).
 January 20 – Jimmy Carter is sworn in as the 39th President of the United States, and Walter F. Mondale is sworn in as Vice President of the United States.
 January 21 – U.S. President Jimmy Carter pardons Vietnam War draft evaders.
 January 23 – Roots begins its phenomenally successful run on ABC.
 January 28 – The Great Lakes Blizzard of 1977 hits Buffalo, New York.
 January 1 to 31:
 In contrast to the contiguous US, Alaska had to that point its warmest January on record with a mean of  being  warmer than the 1925 to 1974 average and  warmer than Alaska's previous record warmest January 1937.

February
 February 4
 Fleetwood Mac's Grammy Award-winning album Rumours is released.
 Eleven CTA commuters are killed when an elevated train derails from the Loop in central Chicago. 
 February 12 – Actress Christa Helm is fatally stabbed on a sidewalk in West Hollywood. The perpetrator is never identified.
 February 18 – The Space Shuttle Enterprise test vehicle goes on its maiden "flight" while sitting on top of a Boeing 747, at Edwards Air Force Base in California.

March

 March 9 — Approximately a dozen armed Hanafi Movement Muslims take over three buildings in Washington, D.C., killing one person and taking more than 130 hostages. The hostage situation ends two days later.
 March 11 — Walt Disney Productions' 22nd feature film, The Many Adventures of Winnie the Pooh, is released. It is the studio's most critically well-received film in years and the last in the Disney canon in which the late Walt Disney was involved with in any capacity.
 March 18 — United States lifts its ban on travel by U.S. citizens to Cambodia, Cuba, North Korea, and Vietnam.
 March 15 — Tenor Luciano Pavarotti and the PBS opera series Live from the Met both make their American television debuts. Pavarotti stars in a complete production of Puccini's La Boheme.
 March 26 — The fundamentalist organization Focus on the Family is founded by Dr. James Dobson.
 March 28 — The 49th Academy Awards ceremony, hosted by Richard Pryor, Ellen Burstyn, Jane Fonda and Warren Beatty, is held at Dorothy Chandler Pavilion in Los Angeles. John G. Avildsen's Rocky receives ten nominations, winning Best Picture and Best Director for Avildsen. Rocky is tied with Sidney Lumet's Network for the most nominations, while the latter film and Alan J. Pakula's All the President's Men both won four awards each. The late Peter Finch becomes the first posthumous actor Oscar winner, winning for Best Actor.

April
 April 4 – Grundy, Virginia, experiences a major flood that causes around $15 million in damages to 228 residential and commercial structures.
 April 5 – Beginning of demonstrations in 10 cities across the U.S., the longest being the 3.5 week sit-in the San Francisco Federal Building to persuade President Jimmy Carter to implement the first Federal civil rights law for people with disabilities, Section 504 of the 1973 Rehabilitation Act, without reinstituting the "separate but equal" doctrine. 
 April 7
 The Toronto Blue Jays play their first game of baseball against the Chicago White Sox.
 The Seattle Mariners play their first-ever game of baseball against the California Angels.
 April 21 – Residents of Dover, Massachusetts, report sightings of the so-called "Dover Demon".

May
 May 4 – The United States Conference of Catholic Bishops rule that divorced Catholics, including those who remarried outside the Church, are no longer automatically excommunicated and can still attend Mass but if they remarry without obtaining a Church annulment, cannot receive Holy Communion and confession. 
 May 8 – Suzanne Lacy's extended performance piece about rape, Three Weeks in May begins in Los Angeles and continues until May 24.
 May 16 – A 20-passenger S-61L helicopter topples sideways at takeoff from the roof of the Pan Am Building in Midtown Manhattan. Four passengers are killed by the turning rotors and a woman at street level is fatally struck by a fallen blade.
 May 17 – Chuck E. Cheese's Pizza Time Theatre first opens in San Jose, California.
 May 25 – The movie Star Wars, directed by George Lucas is released as the first film in the Star Wars Saga and the first in the Original Trilogy. 
 May 26 – George Willig climbs the South Tower of the World Trade Center.
 May 27 – Space Mountain opens at Disneyland and will become one of the park's most popular attractions.
 May 28 – The Beverly Hills Supper Club in Southgate, Kentucky is engulfed in fire, killing 165 inside.
 May 29 – Indianapolis 500: A. J. Foyt becomes the first driver (to date) to win a record four times.

June
 June 4–5 – Humboldt Park riot in Chicago.
 June 5 – The Portland Trail Blazers defeat the Philadelphia 76ers 109–107 to win the NBA finals 4–2. Bill Walton is named series MVP.
 June 7 – After campaigning by Anita Bryant and her anti-gay "Save Our Children" crusade, Miami-Dade County, Florida voters overwhelmingly vote to repeal the county's gay rights ordinance.
 June 10 – Assassin James Earl Ray escapes from Brushy Mountain State Penitentiary in Petros, Tennessee. He is recaptured on June 13. 
 June 16 – Oracle Corporation is incorporated in Redwood Shores, California as Software Development Laboratories (SDL) by Larry Ellison, Bob Miner and Ed Oates.
 June 20 – The Supreme Court of the United States rules that states are not required to spend Medicaid funds on elective abortions.
 June 22 – Walt Disney Productions' 23rd feature film, The Rescuers, is released to box office success and positive critical reception.
 June 25 – American Roy Sullivan is struck by lightning for the 7th time.
 June 26 
 Some 200,000 protesters march through the streets of San Francisco, protesting Anita Bryant's anti-gay remarks and the murder of Robert Hillsborough.
 Elvis Presley performs his final concert, in Indianapolis, Indiana's Market Square Arena. Two previous performances were filmed in Omaha, Nebraska (June 19th) and Rapid City, South Dakota (June 21st) for the TV Special "Elvis In Concert." This special was not televised until October 3 of that year on CBS.
 June 30 – Women Marines disbanded; women are integrated into regular Marine Corps.

July
 July 13 – The New York City blackout of 1977 lasts for 25 hours, resulting in looting and disorder.
 July 19-20 – Flooding in Johnstown, Pennsylvania, caused by massive rainfall, kills over 75 people and causes billions of dollars in damage.
 July 24 – Led Zeppelin plays their last U.S. concert in Oakland, California at the Oakland-Alameda County Coliseum. A brawl erupts between Led Zeppelin's crew and promoter Bill Graham's staff, resulting in criminal assault charges for several of Led Zeppelin's entourage including drummer John Bonham.
 July 28 – The first oil through the Trans-Alaska Pipeline System reaches Valdez, Alaska.

August
 August 3 – United States Senate hearings on MKULTRA are held.
 August 4 – U.S. President Jimmy Carter signs legislation creating the United States Department of Energy.
 August 9 – Hulk Hogan debuts as The Super Destroyer for Championship Wrestling from Florida when he is defeated by Don Serrano at John Carroll Catholic High School's gym in Fort Pierce, Florida
 August 10 – David Berkowitz is captured in Yonkers, New York, after over a year of murders in New York City as the Son of Sam.
 August 12 – The NASA Space Shuttle, named Enterprise, makes its first test free-flight from the back of a Boeing 747 Shuttle Carrier Aircraft (SCA).
 August 15 – The Big Ear, a radio telescope operated by Ohio State University as part of the SETI project, receives a radio signal from deep space; the event is named the "WOW!" signal for a notation made by a volunteer on the project.
August 16 – Elvis Presley, the king of rock and roll, dies in his home in Graceland at age 42. 75,000 fans lined the streets of Memphis for this funeral, which occurred on August 18, but wasn't televised until August 20.
 August 20 – Voyager program: The United States launches the Voyager 2 spacecraft.

September

  September – Evangelical pastor Oral Roberts publishes plans to build the 'City of God Hospital' in Tulsa, Oklahoma. The towers are completed in 1981 for $120m ($299m, in 2012)
 September 4 – The Golden Dragon Massacre takes place in San Francisco, California.
 September 5 – Voyager program: Voyager 1 is launched after a brief delay.
 September 7 – Treaties between Panama and the United States on the status of the Panama Canal are signed. The U.S. agrees to transfer control of the canal to Panama at the end of the 20th century.
 September 13 – Soap debuts on ABC and launches the career of Billy Crystal.
 September 18 – Courageous, skippered by Ted Turner, sweeps Australia in the 24th America's Cup yachting race.
 September 19 – Nicaraguan drug cartels rise to power in New Jersey. Pablo Escobar as facilitating drug lord.
 Under pressure from the Carter Administration, President Anastasio Somoza Debayle lifts the state of siege in Nicaragua.
 Closure of steelworks in Youngstown, Ohio, is announced.
 September 21 – A nuclear non-proliferation pact is signed by 15 countries, including the United States and the Soviet Union.
September 23 – Jazz-rock group Steely Dan releases their sixth studio album Aja; it becomes their highest charting album at No. 3 and goes on to win a Grammy Award.
 September 29
 Singer-songwriter Billy Joel releases his fifth studio album The Stranger; it becomes the first of several hit albums, spawning five hit singles, going 10× platinum in the US, and later ranking at No. 70 on the list of Rolling Stone's 500 Greatest Albums of All Time.
 The modern Food Stamp Program begins when the Food Stamp Act of 1977 is enacted.
 September 30 – A series of partial government shutdowns occur, finally ending in December.

October
 October 1 
Energy Research and Development Administration part of Department of Energy.
Pelé plays his final professional football game as a member of the New York Cosmos.
 October 6 – Irish American mobster Danny Greene is murdered with a car bomb by the Cleveland crime family in Lyndhurst, Ohio.
 October 12 – The passage of the Community Reinvestment Act.
 October 14 – Anita Bryant is famously pied by four gay rights activists during a press conference in Des Moines, Iowa. This event resulted in her political fallout from anti-gay activism.
 October 18 – Newly acquired and flamboyantly charismatic slugger Reggie Jackson hits three home runs to lead the New York Yankees to their first World Series championship victory since 1962 over the Los Angeles Dodgers in the 1977 World Series in six games.
 October 20 – Three members (lead singer Ronnie Van Zant, guitarist Steve Gaines and a backup singer) of the Southern rock band Lynyrd Skynyrd die in a charter plane crash outside Gillsburg, Mississippi, three days after the release of their fifth studio album Street Survivors.
 October 21 – Rock singer Meat Loaf (real name Marvin Lee Aday) releases the album Bat Out of Hell.
 October 24 – A new Peanuts special, It's Your First Kiss, Charlie Brown, airs on CBS. It shows and names "Heather", the Little Red-Haired Girl, thereupon ending the 'mystery'.

November

 November 6 – The Kelly Barnes Dam, located above Toccoa Falls Bible College near Toccoa, Georgia, fails, killing 39.
 November 8 – San Francisco elects City Supervisor Harvey Milk, the first openly gay elected official of any large city in the U.S.
 November 13 – The comic strip Li'l Abner ends its 43-year run in newspapers.
 November 22 – British Airways inaugurates regular London to New York City supersonic Concorde service.
 November 27 – The Rankin/Bass animated film The Hobbit premieres on NBC in the United States.
 November 28 –  Jazz saxophonist Archie Shepp records "On Green Dolphin Street", the first digitally recorded album to be released commercially in the USA.

December
 December 1 – Pinwheel debuts on Channel C-3 (now Nickelodeon).
 December 11 – After losing 26 games, the Tampa Bay Buccaneers of the US National Football League record their very first win; against the New Orleans Saints.
 December 12 – The Lockheed's top-secret stealth aircraft project, designated Have Blue, precursor to the U.S. F-117A Nighthawk, makes its first flight.
 December 13 – Crash of Air Indiana Flight 216: A DC-3 charter plane carrying the University of Evansville basketball team crashes in rain and dense fog about 90 seconds after takeoff from Evansville Dress Regional Airport. Twenty-nine people die in the crash, including 14 members of the team and head coach Bob Watson.
 December 16 – Mikhail Baryshnikov's 1976 production of Tchaikovsky's ballet The Nutcracker comes to CBS a year after premiering onstage at the Kennedy Center. This adaptation will become the most popular television production of the work.
December 19–21 – The Great Bakersfield Dust Storm hits the Southern San Joaquin Valley, in California; resulting in three deaths and $40 million in damages.

Undated
 Polish-American mathematician Antoni Zygmund authors his major work Measure and Integral.
 Feature films released in 1977 include: Star Wars, Annie Hall, Saturday Night Fever, Close Encounters of the Third Kind, The Goodbye Girl, A Bridge Too Far, Exorcist II: The Heretic, The Turning Point, New York, New York, Smokey and the Bandit
 John Travolta's role in Saturday Night Fever inspired young Americans to wear Flare jeans, an updated version of Bell-bottoms.
 Atari 2600, released in October, popularized the use of microprocessor based hardware and cartridges containing game code.
 The coldest winter for fifty-nine years in the Ohio Valley region and a record dry year throughout the West, especially the Pacific Northwest, creates heating fuel and water shortages plus extended freezing of the Great Lakes and freezing of the Mississippi River as far as Cairo, Illinois.

Ongoing
 Cold War (1947–1991)
 Détente (c. 1969–1979)
 1970s energy crisis (1973–1980)

Births

January 

 January 1 – Abdihakem Abdirahman, Olympic long-distance runner
 January 3 – A. J. Burnett, baseball player
 January 4 
 Graham Elliot, chef, restaurateur and television personality
 Ozell Wells, Dominican-American basketball player, coach, and scout
 January 7 
 Dustin Diamond, actor (d. 2021)
 John Gidding, architect and television host
 January 8 – Amber Benson, actress
 January 9 – Scoonie Penn, basketball player
 January 11
 Devin Ratray, actor
 Nadia Turner, singer
 January 12
 DeJuan Alfonzo, football player
 DJ Paul, DJ, record producer, and rapper for Three 6 Mafia
 January 17 – Kevin Thorn, wrestler
 January 18
 Lloyd Ahlquist, youtuber
 Lazo Alavanja, soccer player
 Allison Alderson, actress, host, and beauty queen
 January 19 – Taliesin Jaffe, actor
 January 20 – Sid Wilson, turntablist for Slipknot
 January 21
 Reggie Austin, football player
 Jerry Trainor, actor, comedian and musician
 January 22 – Ben Taylor, singer-songwriter, musician, and actor
 January 24
 Johann Urb, Estonian-born actor
 Chad Hurley, webmaster and businessman, co-founded YouTube
 January 26 
 Vince Carter, professional basketball player
 Justin Gimelstob, tennis player and coach
 January 28 
 Daunte Culpepper, professional football player
 Antonio Delgado, politician, 79th Lieutenant Governor of New York
 Joey Fatone, singer ('N Sync)
 Lyle Overbay, professional baseball player
 January 29 
 Dion Basco, actor
 Justin Hartley, actor
 Sam Jaeger, actor
 January 30 – Dan Hinote, ice hockey player and coach
 January 31
 Wheeler Antabanez, writer
 Bobby Moynihan, actor and comedian
 Kerry Washington, actress

February 

 February 1
 Lari Ketner, basketball player (d. 2014)
 Robert Traylor, basketball player (d. 2011)
 February 3 – Maitland Ward, actress
 February 4
 Shedrack Anderson III, actor
 Gavin DeGraw, musician and singer-songwriter
 February 5
 Adam Everett, baseball player
 Ahmad Merritt, football player
 February 6 – Brendan Boyle, politician
 February 7 – Hillary Wolf, child actress and judoka
 February 8 
 Dave Farrell, bassist for Linkin Park
 Barry Hall, footballer
 February 11 – Mike Shinoda, singer, rapper, and emcee for Linkin Park
 February 12 – Melissa Beck, television personality and comedian
 February 13 – Randy Moss, football player
 February 15 – Brooks Wackerman, drummer for Avenged Sevenfold and Bad Religion (2001-2005)
 February 16 – Paul Brittain, actor and comedian
 February 17 – Bennie Anderson, football player
 February 18 
 Ike Barinholtz, actor and comedian
 Sean Watkins, guitarist, vocalist and songwriter
 February 19 – Andrew Ross Sorkin, journalist, author, columnist, and producer
 February 20
 Gail Kim, Canadian-born wrestler
 Stephon Marbury, basketball player
 February 21
 Jonathan Safran Foer, author
 Steve Francis, basketball player
 Kevin Rose, internet entrepreneur
 February 24
 Julie E. Adams, politician
 Bronson Arroyo, baseball player and singer
 Floyd Mayweather Jr., boxer
 February 26
 Jeremy Aldrich, soccer player
 Greg Rikaart, actor
 February 28
 Aaron Aguilera, wrestler and actor
 Jason Aldean, country singer
 Lance Archer, wrestler
 Steven Fulop, politician, mayor of Jersey City, New Jersey

March 

 March 1 – Adam Huss, actor, producer, and writer
 March 2
 Steve Armas, soccer player
 Heather McComb, actress
 March 4 – Jeremiah Green, rock musician (d. 2022)
 March 5
 Daniel Alarcón, Peruvian-born  novelist, journalist, and radio producer
 Jennifer Anson, American-born Palaun judoka
 Bryan Berard, ice hockey player
 Mike MacDougal, baseball player
 Wally Szczerbiak, basketball player and sportscaster
 March 6 – Bubba Sparxxx, rapper
 March 8 – James Van Der Beek, actor
 March 9
 Lydia Mackay, voice actress
 Shannon Miller, gymnast
 Robin Thicke, American-born Canadian singer
 March 10 – Bree Turner, actress
 March 11
 Miguel Almaguer, journalist
 Becky Hammon, basketball player
 March 15
 Brian Tee, Japanese-born actor
 Joe Hahn, musician, DJ, director and visual artist for Linkin Park
 March 16 – Richard Swift, singer/songwriter, multi-instrumentalist, producer and short-film maker
 March 22
 Joey Porter, football player and coach
 David Portnoy, media personality
 Tom Poti, ice hockey player
 Lon Symensma, chef
 March 23 – Sammy Morris, football player
 March 24
 Ubusuku Abukusumo, soccer player
 Jessica Chastain, actress and producer
 March 26 – Bianca Kajlich, actress
 March 27 – Roger Velasco, actor
 March 28 – Annie Wersching, actress (d. 2023)

April 

 April 1
 Harold Arceneaux, basketball player
 Paul Kalanithi, neurosurgeon and writer (d. 2015)
 April 3 – Aiden Leslie, singer/songwriter
 April 4 – Adam Dutkiewicz, musician and guitarist for Killswitch Engage and Times of Grace
 April 6 – Teddy Sears, actor
 April 9 – Gerard Way, singer and frontman for My Chemical Romance
 April 10 – Stephanie Sheh, voice actress
 April 11 – Ron Nirenberg, politician, mayor of San Antonio, Texas
 April 12 – Sarah Jane Morris, actress 
 April 14 
 Hameen Ali, football player
 Nate Fox, basketball player (d. 2014)
 Sarah Michelle Gellar, actress
 Chandra Levy, intern (d. 2001)
 Rob McElhenney, actor
 David Valadao, politician
 April 15 – Matt Holt, heavy metal singer (d. 2017)
 April 16
 Jordan Allen-Dutton, writer, producer, and director
 Hayes MacArthur, actor, producer, and screenwriter
 April 21 – Bodhraj Acharya, Nepalese-born scientist
 April 22 – Owen Ashworth, musician
 April 23 
 Kal Penn, actor
 John Cena, professional wrestler
 Eric Edelstein, actor  
 John Oliver, comedian
 April 25 – Ricardo Aleman, author and comedian
 April 26 
 Jason Earles, actor
 Tom Welling, actor
 April 27
 Courtney Alexander, basketball player
 Kunimi Andrea, singer and actress
 April 29
 Matt Bachand, guitarist for Shadows Fall
 Titus O'Neill, wrestler
 April 30 – Alexandra Holden, actress

May 

 May 3
 Ben Olsen, footballer
 Eric Church, country music singer
 Jeffrey Garcia, stand-up comedian, actor and voice actor
 May 5 – Tudor Dixon, businesswoman, political commentator, and political candidate
 May 6 – Brian Aldridge, politician
 May 9 – Maggie Dixon, basketball player and coach (d. 2006)
 May 11 – Sal Alosi, strength and conditioning coach
 May 12 – Rebecca Herbst, actress
 May 13 – Tom Cotton, politician
 May 14 – Roy Halladay, baseball player (d. 2017)
 May 17
 Joaquin Arambula, politician
 Welles Crowther, investment banker (d. 2001)
 May 18 – Ken Amato, football player
 May 19
 Larry Abney, basketball player
 Brandon Inge, baseball player
 May 20 
 Tiger Tyson, gay pornographic film actor, model, and gay porn film director
 Chad Muska, skateboarder
 May 21 – Alicia Albe, gymnast
 May 23 – Heather Wahlquist, actress
 May 26 – Mark Hunter, singer and frontman for Chimaira
 May 27
 Henry Aquino, politician
 David Toland, politician, 52nd Lieutenant Governor of Kansas
 May 28 – Elisabeth Hasselbeck, talk show host 
 May 29
 Rory Albanese, comedian, comedy writer and television producer
 Kevin Arbouet, director, writer, and producer
 May 31
 Guma Aguiar, Brazilian-born businessman and industrialist (missing since 2012)
 Eric Christian Olsen, actor

June 

 June 1
 Sarah Wayne Callies, actress
 Danielle Harris, actress and director
 June 2  
 Zachary Quinto, actor
 A.J. Styles, wrestler
 June 3 
 Travis Hafner, baseball player
 Az-Zahir Hakim, football player
 June 5 
Kristin Gore, author and screenwriter
Christian Martucci, singer/songwriter and guitarist for Black President, The Strychnine Babies, Stone Sour, and The Chelsea Smiles
 June 6 – Matt Heinz, doctor and politician
 June 7 – Joe Horgan, baseball player
 June 8 – Kanye West, recording artist
 June 11
 Darnell Alford, football player
 Ryan Dunn, television personality (d. 2011)
 June 12 – Kenny Wayne Shepherd, singer-songwriter and guitarist
 June 14
 Rashard Anderson, football player (d. 2022)
 De'Adre Aziza, actress and singer
 Chris McAlister, football player  
 June 16
 Rich Attonito, mixed martial artist
 Kerry Wood, baseball player  
 June 19 – Peter Warrick, football player
 June 20
 Ronnie Gene Blevins, actor
 Stephanie White, basketball player
 June 23 – Jason Mraz, singer/songwriter
 June 25
 Jon Akin, soccer player
 Tim Anderson, musician, songwriter, and producer
 June 27 – Dan Andriano, bassist for Alkaline Trio and The Damned Things
 June 28 – Blair Butler, comedian
 June 29
 Jeff Baena, screenwriter and director
 Bradley Stryker, actor
 June 30 – Lyndon Amick, stock car racing driver

July 

 July 1
 Pamela Rogers Turner, teacher and child rapist
 Liv Tyler, actress
 Lovely Warren, politician, mayor of Rochester, New York (2014-2021)
 July 4 – Stephen Rannazzisi, actor and comedian
 July 5 – Steven Sharp Nelson, cellist
 July 7
 Tori Alamaze, singer
 Jessica Chobot, host and writer
 Dan Whitesides, drummer for The Used
 July 8 – Milo Ventimiglia, actor
 July 10 – Cary Joji Fukunaga, director, writer, and cinematographer
 July 11 – Edward Moss, impersonator
 July 12
 Steve Howey, actor
 Brock Lesnar, wrestler and mixed martial artist
 July 13
 Michael Alan, artist
 Ashley Scott, actress  
 Kari Wahlgren, voice actress
 July 15
 Lana Parrilla, actress
 Ray Toro, musician
 July 17 – Brandon Ash, stock car racing driver
 July 21 – Heather Armbrust, bodybuilder
 July 26 – Markwayne Mullin, politician
 July 27
 Martha Madison, actress  
 Jason Zimbler, actor  
 July 28
 Travis Alexander, murder victim (d. 2008)
 Dexter Jackson, football player and sportscaster
 Chris Samuels, football player and coach
 July 29 – Balamurali Ambati, Indian-born ophthalmologist, educator, and researcher
 July 30 – Jaime Pressly, actress
 July 31 – Tim Couch, football player

August 

 August 2
 Julián Alonso, Spanish-born tennis player
 Edward Furlong, actor
 Marc Rizzo, guitarist for Soulfly and Ill Niño
 Jill Underly, politician
 August 3
 Karen Alloy, comedian
 Tom Brady, football player and entrepreneur
 August 6 – Ashlie Atkinson, actress
 August 7 – Jamey Jasta, singer and frontman for Hatebreed and Kingdom of Sorrow
 August 8
 Michael Chernus, actor
 Lindsay Sloane, actress
 August 11 – Pablo Lucio Vasquez, murderer executed by lethal injection (d. 2016)
 August 12 – Plaxico Burress, football player
 August 13 – Karine Jean-Pierre, French-born White House Press Secretary
 August 14
 Kyle Abraham, choreographer and dancer
 Al Shearer, actor
 August 15 – Nicole Paggi, actress
 August 19 – T. J. Holmes, journalist and television personality
 August 23
 Chris M. Allport, filmmaker, actor, singer, and symphonic composer
 Nicole Bobek, figure skater
 August 24 – John Green, author, vlogger, and editor
 August 26 – Morris Peterson, basketball player
 August 28 – Ginger D. Anders, lawyer and politician
 August 30
 Jon Adkins, baseball player
 Shaun Alexander, football player
 Félix Sánchez, Olympic track-and-field athlete
 August 31 – Jeff Hardy wrestler

September 

 September 1
 Jerry Azumah, football player
 Adrienne Wilkinson, actress
 September 2 – Playa Fly, rapper
 September 3
 DJ Envy, radio host
 Jason Andersen, football player
 September 4
 Ian Grushka, bassist for New Found Glory
 Kia Stevens, wrestler and actress
 Timothy "Yogi" Watts, drummer for Demon Hunter
 September 5 – Sin Cara, wrestler and luchador
 September 7
 Chinedu Achebe, football player
 Molly Holly, wrestler
 September 9 – Soulja Slim, rapper (d. 2003)
 September 10 – Anita Allen, Army medic and Olympic pentathlete
 September 11
 Jackie Buscarino, voice actress, writer and producer
 Josette Bynum, wrestler
 Ludacris, rapper and actor
 September 12 – 2 Chainz, rapper
 September 13
 Brandt Andersen, activist, director, writer, and producer
 Fiona Apple, singer
 September 15
 Kenny Blank, actor and musician
 Marisa Ramirez, actress
 Jason Terry, basketball player
 September 17 – Andrea Anderson, Olympic sprinter
 September 19 – Erica Ash, actress, comedian, singer, and model
 September 21
 Feda Almaliti, autistic activist (d. 2020)
 Hank Fraley, football player
 September 23 – Brent Abernathy, baseball player
 September 24
 Elizabeth Bogush, actress
 Kabeer Gbaja-Biamila, football player
 September 25
 Clea DuVall, actress
 Robbie Jones, actor
 Joel David Moore, actor
 September 26 – Sirena Irwin, actress
 September 27 – Michael C. Maronna, actor
 September 29 – Heath Bell, baseball player

October 

 October 6
 Melinda Doolittle, 3rd place finalist on American Idol (season 6)
 Francis X. Suarez, politician, mayor of Miami, Florida
 October 10 – Tom Ashworth, football player
 October 11
 Matt Bomer, actor
 Rhett McLaughlin, youtuber
 October 12 – Bode Miller, Olympic skier
 October 13
 Paul Pierce, basketball player
 Quincy Carter, American football player
 Kiele Sanchez, actress
 October 14
 Jason Adasiewicz, vibraphonist and composer
 Kelly Schumacher, American-born Canadian basketball and volleyball player
 October 15 – Jeff Sutphen, actor and producer
 October 16
 John Mayer, singer/songwriter and record producer
 Stephen Richards, singer and frontman for Taproot
 October 17
 Alimi Ballard, actor
 Bryan Bertino, filmmaker
 October 18 – Peter Sohn, animator, voice actor, storyboard artist, and film director
 October 27 – Mat Lucas, voice actor
 October 20
 Steve Anthony, wrestler
 Jennifer Hall, actress
 Sam Witwer, actor and musician
 October 22 – Jocelyn Benson, politician
 October 23 – Matt Allen, football player
 October 25 – The Alchemist, record producer, DJ, rapper, and songwriter
 October 26 – Jon Heder, actor and voice actor
 October 29 – Jon Abrahams, actor

November 

 November 2 – Randy Harrison, actor
 November 3
 Philip Amelio, actor and teacher (d. 2005)
 Greg Plitt, fitness model, actor, and former Army Ranger (d. 2015)
 November 4 – Larry Bigbie, baseball player
 November 5 – Sherry Argov, French-born author
 November 8
 Bucky Covington, singer
 Nick Punto, baseball player
 November 10 
 Josh Barnett, mixed martial artist
 Brittany Murphy, actress (d. 2009)
 Lea Moreno Young, actress 
 November 11 – Scoot McNairy, actor
 November 14 – Brian Dietzen, actor
 November 15
 Jon Hurwitz, screenwriter, director, and producer
 Sean Murray, actor
 Robaire Smith, football player
 Logan Whitehurst, singer/songwriter and drummer for The Velvet Teen (d. 2006)
 November 16 – Maggie Gyllenhaal, actress
 November 19
 Reid Scott, actor
 Markuann Smith, actor, producer, and director
 Kerri Strug, Olympic gymnast
 November 20 – Josh Turner, country music singer
 November 21 – Jonas Jennings, football player
 November 22
 David Clinger, road racing cyclist
 Tim Keller, politician, mayor of Albuquerque, New Mexico
 November 24 – Colin Hanks, actor
 November 27
 Adam Archuleta, football player
 Cheryl Bogart, music industry veteran and spinal cord injury awareness advocate
 Veronica Portillo, television personality
 Alex Wagner, journalist
 November 28 – DeMya Walker, basketball player
 November 29
 Jason Alfaro, baseball player
 Andy Beshear, politician, 63rd Governor of Kentucky
 November 30
 Steve Aoki, DJ, record producer, music programmer, and record executive
 Nelsan Ellis, actor and playwright (d. 2017)

December 

 December 1 – Brad Delson, lead guitarist for Linkin Park
 December 2
 Sadie Alexandru, actress and model
 Robert Garcia, politician
 December 3 – Troy Evans, football player
 December 4 – Nancy Mace, politician
 December 6 – Lindsey Alley, actress and singer
 December 8 – Ryan Newman, stock car racing driver
 December 10
 Acid Betty, drag queen
 Spencer Allen, baseball player and coach
 December 12
 Troy Andrew, football player
 Orlando Hudson, baseball player
 December 13 – Nikki Fried, politician
 December 16 – Kevin Gillespie, comic book artist
 December 18
 Maria Brink, singer and lead vocalist for In This Moment
 Vanessa Trump, model
 December 21
 Michel Abboud, Lebanese-born artist and architect
 A. J. Bowen, actor and producer
 Mark Dice, author and conspiracy theorist
 Kevin Miller, voice actor
 Gregory Siff, visual artist, designer, writer and actor
 December 22
 Dai Andrews, performance artist
 Michael Watson, politician
 December 23 – Alge Crumpler, American football player
 December 24 – Michael Raymond-James, actor
 December 27 – Erin Aldrich, Olympic high jumper and volleyball player
 December 28
 John Jairo Bedoya Jr., wrestler (d. 2020)
 Michael Spears, actor
 December 29
 Laveranues Coles, American football player
 Katherine Moennig, actress
 December 30
 Jimmy Alapag, basketball player
 Laila Ali, boxer
 Aesha Ash, ballerina
 Kenyon Martin, basketball player
 December 31 – Donald Trump Jr., businessman and TV personality, son of Donald Trump

Full Date Unknown 

 Faisal Alam, gay rights activist
 Rumaan Alam, writer
 Cecilia Alemani, Italian-born curator
 Kate Ali, artist
 Hannah Allam, journalist and reporter
 Francis Allen-Palenske, businessman and politician
 Charles Allen, politician
 Paul Coy Allen,  filmmaker, producer, and director
 Ilkay Altintas, Turkish-born data and computer scientist
 Bill Anderson, politician
 Holly Andres, photographer
 George Arison, Georgian-born businessman
 Brad Ascalon, industrial designer
 Sarah Ashton-Cirillo, journalist
 Joe Asselin, blues musician
 Amanda Auchter, writer, professor, and editor

Deaths

January

 January 2 – Erroll Garner, jazz pianist (b. 1921)
 January 5 – Onslow Stevens, American actor (b. 1902)
 January 6 – William Gropper, American artist (b. 1897)
 January 14 – Peter Finch, English-born actor (b. 1916)
 January 17 – Gary Gilmore, criminal (b. 1940)
 January 23 – Toots Shor, proprietor (b. 1903)
 January 28 – Burt Mustin, American actor (b. 1884)
 January 29 – Freddie Prinze, actor and comedian (b. 1954)

February
 February 3 – Pauline Starke, American actress (b. 1901)
 February 4 – Brett Halliday, mystery writer (b. 1904)
 February 12 – Henry Jordan, American football player and member of the Pro Football Hall of Fame (b. 1935)
 February 20 – Ralph Hungerford, American naval officer, 33rd Governor of American Samoa (b. 1896)
 February 21 – John Hubley, American animator (b. 1914)
 February 27 – Allison Hayes, American actress (b. 1930)

March

 March 3 – Percy Marmont, American actor (b. 1883)
 March 8 – Henry Hull, American actor (b. 1890)
 March 10 – E. Power Biggs, English-American organist (b. 1906)
 March 11 – Ulysses S. Grant IV, American geologist and paleontologist (b. 1893)
 March 14 – Fannie Lou Hamer, American civil rights activist (b. 1917)
 March 19 – William L. Laurence, Jewish Lithuanian-American journalist (b. 1888)
 March 29 – Charles Nicoletti, American gangster (b. 1916)

April
 April 21 – Gummo Marx, vaudeville performer (b. 1893)
 April 23 – Charles D. Herron, United States Army general (b. 1877)

May
 May 9 – James Jones, author (b. 1921)
 May 10 – Joan Crawford, actress (b. 1904)

June
 June 16 – Wernher von Braun, German, later American, aerospace engineer and space architect (b. 1912 in Germany)

July
 July 9 – Alice Paul, suffragist (b. 1885)

August

 August 1 – Francis Gary Powers, American U-2 spy plane pilot (b. 1929)
 August 3 – Alfred Lunt, American actor (b. 1892)
 August 5 – Waldo L. Schmitt, American biologist (b. 1887)
 August 9 – George Kenney, World War II United States Army Air Forces general (b. 1889)
 August 14 – Ron Haydock, actor (b. 1940)
 August 16 – Elvis Presley, American actor, musician and singer-songwriter (b. 1935)
 August 17 – Delmer Daves, American screenwriter and director (b. 1904)
 August 19 – Groucho Marx, American actor and comedian (b. 1890)
 August 22 – Sebastian Cabot, English actor (b. 1918)
 August 29 – Jean Hagen, American actress (b. 1923)

September

 September 1 – Ethel Waters, American singer and actress (b. 1896)
 September 2 – Stephen Dunne, American actor (b. 1911)
 September 8 – Zero Mostel, American actor (b. 1915)
 September 16 – Maria Callas, Greek soprano (b. 1923)
 September 24
 Sherm Lollar, American baseball player and coach (b. 1924)
 Frederick Merk, American historian (b. 1887)
 September 26 – Ernie Lombardi American baseball player and member of the MLB Hall of Fame (b. 1908)
 September 29 – Robert McKimson, American animator and director (b. 1910)

October

 October 2 – Joseph William Woodrough, American federal judge (b. 1873)
 October 3 – Tay Garnett, American film director (b. 1894)
 October 6 – Danny Greene, Irish American mobster (b. 1933)
 October 8 – Joe Greenstein, Polish-born American strongman (b. 1893)
 October 11 – MacKinlay Kantor, American writer, Pulitzer Prize winner (b. 1904)
 October 12 – Dorothy Davenport, American actress (b. 1895)
 October 14 – Bing Crosby, American pop singer and actor (b. 1903)
 October 20 – Three members of American rock group, Lynyrd Skynyrd, killed in plane crash:
 Ronnie Van Zant, lead singer (b. 1948)
 Cassie Gaines, lead singer (b. 1948)
 Steve Gaines, lead singer and guitarist (b. 1949)
 October 27 – James M. Cain, American writer (b. 1892)

November
 November 3 – Florence Vidor, silent film actress (b. 1895)
 November 5 – Guy Lombardo, bandleader (b. 1902 in Canada)
 November 8 – Bucky Harris, baseball player and manager (b. 1896)
 November 9 – Gertrude Astor, film character actress (b. 1887)
 November 16 – José Acosta, baseball starting pitcher (b. 1891)
 November 21 – Richard Carlson, actor and screen director (b. 1912)

December
 December 5 – Rahsaan Roland Kirk, American jazz multi-instrumentalist (b. 1935)
 December 15 – Wilfred Kitching, 7th General of the Salvation Army (b. 1893)
 December 19 – Nellie Tayloe Ross, 13th Governor of Wyoming from 1925 to 1927 and director of the United States Mint from 1933 to 1953; first female state governor in the U.S. (b. 1876)
 December 25 – Charlie Chaplin, actor (b. 1889)

See also 
 1977 in American soccer
 1977 in American television
 List of American films of 1977
 Timeline of United States history (1970–1989)

Notes

References

External links
 

 
1970s in the United States
United States
United States
Years of the 20th century in the United States